Our Lady of the Desert School (OLDS) is a coeducational private school combination Elementary, Middle School and High school located in Yucca Valley, San Bernardino County, California, USA. The school is orthodox Catholic in curriculum and administration. It is not affiliated with the Roman Catholic Diocese of San Bernardino.

Currently, OLDS has 12 students and 3 teachers, with additional administration and support staff. This gives it a 4:1 student-to-teacher ratio; the California average is 16. The Principal is Daniel Foran.

It describes its primary purpose as preparing students for the challenges they will face in this life so to get to heaven with education as a means to that end.

There is also a 15-bed assisted living facility located on the adjoining property.

References

External links
School webpage

High schools in San Bernardino County, California
Elementary schools in California
Middle schools in California
Catholic secondary schools in California
Schools in San Bernardino County, California
Yucca Valley, California
Educational institutions established in 1983
1983 establishments in California